Stars of Eger (Hungarian: Egri csillagok) is a 1923 Hungarian silent historical film directed by Pál Fejös and starring Mara Jankovszky, Zoltán Makláry and Ili K. Takács. It is an adaptation of the 1899 novel Eclipse of the Crescent Moon by Géza Gárdonyi. A second film adaptation was made in 1968.

Cast
 Mara Jankovszky - Éva Cecey
 Zoltán Makláry - Jumurdzsák 
 Ili K. Takács - Ceceyné 
 Gyula Stella   
 Gyula Zilahi   
 Sándor Fülöp   
 Nándor Bihary - István Dobó
 Elemér Baló   
 Lajos Réthey - Pap 
 Johann von Vásáry  
 László Angyal - Hóhér 
 Béla Pogány -  Bálint Török
 Béla Sziklai -  Gergely Bornemissza
 Kornélné Jolán Sziklay   
 Rezsõ Szántó   
 Ferenc Szécsi

Bibliography
 Cunningham, John. Hungarian Cinema: From Coffee House to Multiplex. Wallflower Press, 2004.

External links

1923 films
Hungarian silent films
Hungarian-language films
Films directed by Paul Fejos
Hungarian black-and-white films
Hungarian historical drama films
1920s historical drama films
1923 drama films
Silent historical drama films